The 2006 Voyageurs Cup was the fifth edition of the Voyageurs Cup tournament started by the Canadian supporters group The Voyageurs.  The 2006 Edition of the tournament featured  Montreal Impact, Toronto Lynx and Vancouver Whitecaps.  

The 2006 Voyageurs Cup was won by Montreal Impact won by a single point in the table over the second place Toronto Lynx, clinching the competition in the final all-Canadian match of the 2006 USL season in a scoreless draw against the Linx on September 8, 2006. All three sides recorded a single win in the competition, however only Montreal was able to go undefeated against the other Canadian sides recording a win and three draws totaling six points in the table.

Format
Each team played two matches (home and away) against each other team. All of these matches were drawn from the USL First Division 2006 regular season.  The 2006 USL First Division was not a balanced home and away competition where each team played the others an equal number of times; only the final two matches played between each city's team is counted as a Voyageurs Cup 2006 match. In each match, 3 points were awarded for wins (even had it come in extra time), 1 point was awarded for a draw, and 0 points were awarded for losses (even had it come in extra time). The four teams were ranked according to the total number of points obtained in all matches.

The team ranked highest after all matches have been played was to be crowned the champion, and would be awarded the Voyageurs Cup.

Standings

Results by round

Schedule

Champion

Top scorers
Source

References

2006
2006 domestic association football cups
2006 in Canadian soccer